Shad Galdi Mahalleh (also Romanized as Shād Galdī Maḩalleh; also known as Shāh Galdī Maḩalleh) is a village in Chubar Rural District, Haviq District, Talesh County, Gilan Province, Iran. At the 2006 census, its population was 141, in 32 families.

References 

Populated places in Talesh County